La Bouilladisse is a commune in the Bouches-du-Rhône department in the Provence-Alpes-Côte d'Azur region of Southern France. In 2017, it had a population of 6,194.

Geography
The A52 autoroute skirts the south-western border of the commune's territory. In 2025, La Bouilladisse will be served by two stations of the Aubagne tramway after the northern extension of Line T is completed.

History
The commune was created on 6 July 1880 as La Bourine, when it was separated from the neighbouring village of Auriol. It adopted its current name on 20 January 1910.

Population

Sights
 The church of St.Laurent, dating from the twentieth century.
 The chapel of La Bourine, dating from the eighteenth century.
 The two 18th century châteaux of Velin-Tournon and La Malvesine.

See also
Communes of the Bouches-du-Rhône department

References

External links
Official village website 
Annuaire Mairie website 

Communes of Bouches-du-Rhône